The Accademia Veneziana was an Italian learned society active in Venice from 1557 to 1561. It was founded by Federico Badoer and shut down by the Venetian government.

It was followed by another Accademia Veneziana which was active from 1594 to 1608.

See also

 List of academies of fine art in Italy
 List of learned societies in Italy

References

Learned societies of Italy
Venetian Renaissance
1557 establishments in the Republic of Venice
1561 disestablishments in the Republic of Venice